Kay Gabriel is an essayist and poet. Gabriel is the author of two books of collected poetry, A Queen in Bucks County and Kissing Other People or the House of Fame. Together with Andrea Abi-Karam, Gabriel co-edited an anthology of trans and gender non-conforming poetry, titled We Want It All: An Anthology of Radical Trans Poetics, published by Nightboat Books in 2020. The book was a  2021 Lambda Literary Award Finalist. Her writing and poetry have appeared in The Brooklyn Rail, Social Text, The Recluse, and The Believer amongst other publications. She lives and works in New York.

Work 
Gabriel graduated from Princeton University with a Ph.D. in classics. Gabriel's scholarly work surveys the intersections of classics and modernist studies. She is concerned with historical materialism, utopia, and aesthetics and explores this through a series of case studies in the 20th-century interpretation and adaptation of Euripides.

In 2017, Gabriel wrote and published a book titled: Elegy Department Spring / Candy Sonnets 1 through BOAAT Press. She is the recipient of Poetry Project fellowship and the Lambda Literary fellowship.

She is a co-editor of the anthology on trans poetics with writer Andrea Abi-Karam published in 2020 by Nightboat Books. Poets featured in the book include Joshua Jennifer Espinoza, Sylvia Rivera, Bryn Kelly, and Leslie Feinberg.

Publications 

 A Queen in Bucks County (Nightboat Books, 2022)
 Kissing Other People or the House of Fame (Rosa Press, 2021) 
 We Want It All: An Anthology of Radical Trans Poetics (Nightboat Books, 2020), co-editor

References

21st-century American essayists
21st-century American poets

21st-century American women writers

American women essayists

American women poets
Writers from New York City
Year of birth missing (living people)
Living people